CF San Pedro de Atacama is an association football team from Chile which represents the territory of San Pedro de Atacama at association football. Their home games are played at the Estadio de Hanga Roa, which has a capacity of approximately 1,000 people.

The team played two unofficial games against a team from the San Pedro de Atacama in 2010 and 2011. Before playing its first official match in the first round of the Copa Chile 2010; CF Rapa Nui lost in 2 matches against Universidad Católica. In the Copa Chile 2011, the team is eliminated for Municipal Mejillones.

For its game against Universidad Católica and Municipal Mejillones, the team was coached by former Chilean international Hugo Tabilo, who spent several weeks honing the skills of the local players, as well as teaching them the basics of heading, shooting, and positioning.

Football clubs in Chile
Association football clubs established in 2010
2010 establishments in Chile